Narakakkanam Weir (Malayalam:നാരകക്കാനം തടയണ) is a diversion dam constructed across Narakakkanam River in Mariyapuram panchayath of Thankamani Village in Idukki district in Kerala, India. Narakakkanam weir is an augmentation weir for the Idukki Hydro Electric Project . Narakakkanam, Azhutha, Vazhikkadavu, Vadakkepuzha and Kuttiar diversion schemes were later added to augment the Idukki reservoir .

Specifications
Location	Latitude : 9⁰ 50′ N
Longitude: 77⁰ 00′ E
Panchayath : Mariyapuram	
Village: Thankamani	
District : Idukki
River Basin : Periyar
River : Narakakkanam river
Release from Dam to river : Periyar
Taluk through which release flows : Thodupuzha
Year of completion : 
Name of Project : Idukki HEP
Purpose of Project : Hydro Power
Installed capacity of the Project	780 MW

Type of Dam : Concrete- Gravity
Classification ; Weir
Maximum Water Level (MWL) : EL 770.00 m
Full Reservoir Level ( FRL): EL 768.00 m
Storage at FRL	0.00396 Mm3
Height from deepest foundation : 11.50 m
Length : 45.20 m
Spillway : Ungated – Overflow section
Crest Level : EL 768.00 m
River Outlet : Not provided
Officers in charge & phone No.	Assistant Executive Engineer, Idukki Augmentation Scheme, Moolamattom. Phone-9496009429

References

Dams in Kerala